Correnti is an Italian surname. Notable people with the surname include:

Cesare Correnti (1815–1888), Italian revolutionary and politician
Giovanni Correnti (1940–2016), Italian lawyer and politician
Maria Cristina Correnti (born 1972), Italian women's basketball player

Italian-language surnames